The 1922 United Kingdom general election in Northern Ireland was held on 15 November 1922. There were ten constituencies, seven single-seat constituencies with elected by FPTP and three two-seat constituencies with MPs elected by bloc voting. Only two of the constituencies had contested elections.

It was the first election held after the Government of Ireland Act 1920, which had reduced the number of seats in the House of Commons of the United Kingdom in the region designated as Northern Ireland from 30 to 13. It was also the first election held after the approval of the Anglo-Irish Treaty, whereby the Irish Free State separated from the  United Kingdom with effect from 6 December 1922, a few weeks after the election was held.

The focus of politics in Northern Ireland had shifted to the Parliament of Northern Ireland, after the first general election to the House of Commons of Northern Ireland in May 1921. The party leaders of the three parties had been elected to seats in this parliament rather than at Westminster.

Results
The Ulster Unionist Party was dominant in this election, and won the most seats at every election in Northern Ireland until the 2005 general election. They took the Conservative Party whip in the House of Commons.

The Nationalist Party was a successor to the Irish Parliamentary Party which had suffered a large defeat in the previous election, now continuing in the area of Northern Ireland.

In the previous election, Sinn Féin had won three of the seats in this region. The Irish Free State had been in midst of the Irish Civil War from June 1922, which divided Sinn Féin into Pro-Treaty and Anti-Treaty factions (soon to become separate parties), and it did not contest this election to Westminster.

In the election as a whole, the Conservatives led by Bonar Law won an absolute majority of 344 of the 615 seats.

MPs elected

Changes since 1918
At the previous general election, the seats won in the area which would become Northern Ireland were:

The Sinn Féin members elected sat as TDs for the First Dáil, a revolutionary parliament for an Irish Republic.

The table below indicates the political career of each of those elected in 1918 after the 1922 general election:

References

Northern Ireland
1922
1922 elections in Northern Ireland